The Fisherman is an American horror novel by John Langan. It won the 2016 Bram Stoker Award.

Synopsis 
Abraham or Abe, as he prefers, is a widower who struggles to find peace after his wife's death. After a bout of alcoholism, Abe uses fishing to find peace. Abe forms a friendship with his coworker Dan, who recently survived a terrible accident that left him a widower as well. After some weekends of fishing Dan suggests the pair try out Dutchman's Creek, a mysterious fishing spot with a cursed past that's rumoured to bring back lost loved ones. On their way to the creek, they stop at a diner and are warned of the dangers of Dutchman's Creek;  ignoring the warning, the two men continue on their way. At the creek they come face to face with the mysterious "Der Fisher", who is attempting to catch the primordial Leviathan. They are faced with the choice to help him and regain their lost loves or defy him and fight for survival.

Reception 
The Fisherman received mostly positive reception.

Martin Cahill of Tor praised the novel saying "Langan's novel is deliberate, elegant, and beautifully written; the horror and trauma of these two men is explored to the bone, and in the end, knowing them so well only makes the horrors to come that much more terrifying". Terrence Rafferty of the New York Times remarked, "Langan writes elegant prose, and the novel's rolling, unpredictable flow has a distinctive rhythm, the rise and fall of its characters' real grief'

Others reviewers such as Publishers Weekly praised Langan's imagery but felt the story within the story bogged down the novel

References

External links 

https://wordhorde.com/books/the-fisherman/

2010s horror novels
Lovecraftian horror
Bram Stoker Award for Novel winners